Zsolt Németh (born 15 April 1970) is a Hungarian water polo player. He competed in the men's tournament at the 1996 Summer Olympics.

References

External links
 

1970 births
Living people
Hungarian male water polo players
Olympic water polo players of Hungary
Water polo players at the 1996 Summer Olympics
Water polo players from Budapest